The flag of Vatican City was adopted on 7 June 1929, the year Pope Pius XI signed the Lateran Treaty with Italy, creating a new independent state governed by the Holy See. The Vatican City flag is modeled on the 1808 yellow and white flag of the earlier Papal States, to which a papal tiara and keys were later added. The Vatican (and the Holy See) also refers to it, interchangeably, as the flag of the Holy See.

Description

The flag consists of two vertical bands, one of gold or yellow (hoist side) and one of white with the crossed keys of Saint Peter and the Papal Tiara centered in the white band. The crossed keys consist of a golden and a silver key, in which the silver key is placed in the dexter position. Despite the widespread idea that the flag is square, its proportions are not specified in the constitution, and in response to a letter sent in this regard, the nunciature in Germany explicitly mentioned that the flag does not have to be square.

The coat of arms of Vatican City is present in the white half. The coat of arms consists of:
 the papal tiara (as used under the pontificate of Pius XI);
 the two keys which represent the Keys of Heaven (according to the Gospel of Matthew 16:19) given by Jesus Christ to St Peter. The popes are regarded as the successor of Peter, and the gold and silver keys have been significant elements in the symbolism of the Holy See since the 13th century. The gold represents spiritual power, while the silver key represents worldly power. The order of the keys on the coat of arms of Vatican City is the reverse of the coat of arms of the Holy See, in order to distinguish between the two entities.
 a red cord connecting the keys.

The yellow and white of the flag also refer to the keys – in heraldic terminology, there is no distinction between yellow and gold (the metallic color or), nor between white and silver (argent).
The Argent color has also been reported in relation with the white mountains of Lebanon and of the biblical city of Miye ou Miye according to the Lebanese Historian Anis Freiha.

The placing of gold and white side-by-side is considered a violation of the rule of tincture; it can be difficult for the eye to distinguish between the two bands. Armorist Bruno Heim criticised the flag for placing silver keys on a white field, and suggested a new flag with the papal arms on a red shield in the centre.

Usage
The flag is displayed in many Catholic churches and institutions worldwide, often alongside the national flag of where the church or institution is located.

During 2018 visit by Pope Francis to Ireland, South Dublin County Council refused to fly the Vatican flag; a local petrol station began to fly the flag in response.

A Police Scotland list of flags which could be a criminal offence to display "in a threatening manner" included the Vatican flag; sectarianism is common in Scotland, especially in Glasgow, and the Vatican flag could supposedly be flown as a sign of Catholic identity to intimidate Protestant neighbours.

History

The Papal States traditionally used a yellow and red cockade, the traditional colors of the Roman Senate and the Roman people. However, these colors were not used on flags. In 1808 Pope Pius VII ordered the Vatican's Noble Guard and other troops to replace red color with white, in order to distinguish them from the troops that had been incorporated into Napoleon's army.

In 1803, the Papal States started using a white merchant flag with the Papal coat of arms in the centre. This flag was made official on 7 June 1815. On 17 September 1825, it was replaced with a yellow and white flag which took its colours from the materials of the key (yellow for gold, white for silver). These colors were probably taken from the 1808 flag of the Palatine guard. This was the first bicolour used by the Papal States and the ancestor of the modern flag of Vatican City. The merchant flag also served as a state flag on land.

Starting in 1831, the papal infantry flew square yellow and white flags. At first, they were diagonally divided, but after 1849 they were vertically divided like the merchant flag. The last infantry colour, adopted in 1862, was a plain square white and yellow flag.

On 8 February 1849, while Pope Pius IX was in exile in Gaeta, a Roman Republic was declared. The new government's flag was the Italian tricolor with the motto "Dio e Popolo" on the central stripe. The papal government and its flags were restored on 2 July 1849. On 20 September 1870, the Papal States were conquered by Italy and the yellow and white flags fell out of official use.

After the Lateran Treaty was signed in 1929, papal authorities decided to use the 1825 merchant flag as the state flag of the soon to be independent Vatican City state. However, the official drawing in the constitution used a drawing of the square 1862 infantry flag as a template. The treaty came into effect on 7 June 1929, and with it the newly-square Vatican flag.

Gallery

See also

List of flags of the Papacy
History of Christian flags
Christian Flag
Index of Vatican City-related articles

Notes

References

External links

 
 Flag of Vatican City by Rev. William M. Becker

Flags introduced in 1929
Flag
National flags
Religious flags
Christian symbols
Christian iconography